The Gaita-de-fole coimbrã is a type of old Iberian bagpipe. Along with the machinho de Coimbra - a kind of cavaquinho, and the viola toeira - a traditional guitar, it is one of the most important traditional music instruments in the Beira Litoral Province. The Coimbra bagpipe belongs to the Iberian gaita-family. Unlike a Galician bagpipe, the chanter is thinner and smaller and presents an old "out-of-tune" scale, the drone is larger, heavy, but showing a fine woodturning job, and the old blow mechanism is primitive and very hard to handle. Also the goat skin is used in a different way from the North of Portugal and Galicia: the chanter goes to the "left" leg, the drone to the "right" leg, and the blow tube on the neck.

University of Coimbra 
Bagpipes and charamelas were played until the late 19th century at the University of Coimbra. It's an old tradition that bagpipers from the small villages near Coimbra come twice a year to Coimbra. Invited by University Students they come to celebrate the Queima das Fitas and the Cortejo das Latas e Imposição de Insígnias.

Tradition surrounding Coimbra 
Traditional bagpipers never disappeared from the small villages near Coimbra. They still play in religious ceremonies and festivals as did their ancestors. Old secular culture, as Procissões, are preceded by the traditional Gaiteiro, a musical group concerning of one bagpiper and two drummers (caixa and bombo).

Bagpipes
Portuguese musical instruments